A special election was held in  on July 31, 1800 to fill a vacancy left by the resignation, on June 7, 1800, of John Marshall (F), who was named Secretary of State by President John Adams.

Election results

Tazewell took his seat November 26, 1800

See also
List of special elections to the United States House of Representatives

References

Virginia 1800 13
Virginia 1800 13
1800 13
Virginia 13
United States House of Representatives 13
United States House of Representatives 1800 13